Junior is a given name, nickname, and surname often used by people who are the second in their family with the same name (for more information, see generational titles). It may refer to:

People with the given name
 Júnior (Filipino singer) (1943–2014), Filipino singer
 Junior (geographer), 4th century AD Roman geographer whose writings are found in the Classici auctores e vaticanis codicibus excerptis
 Junior Aliberti (born 1984), Uruguayan footballer
 Junior Bent (born 1970), English former footballer 
 Junior Castillo (born 1986), Dominican boxer
 Júnior César (born 1982), Brazilian footballer
 Júnior Díaz (born 1983), Costa Rican footballer
 Junior D. Edwards (1926–1951), United States Army soldier during the Korean War, recipient of the Medal of Honor
 Junior Eldstål (born 1991), Malaysian-Swedish footballer
 Junior Etou (born 1994), Congolese basketball player for Hapoel Be'er Sheva of the Israeli Basketball Premier League
 Júnior Felício Marques (born 1987), Brazilian footballer
 Junior Félix (born 1967), Dominican baseball player
 Junior Fernandes (born 1988), Chilean footballer
 Junior Flemmings (born 1996), Jamaican footballer
 Junior Giscombe (born 1957), UK-born R&B singer
 Júnior Izaguirre (born 1979), Honduran footballer
 Junior Johnson (1931–2019), American former race car driver
 Junior Jones (born 1970), American former professional boxer
 Junior Kabananga (born 1989), Congolese footballer
 Junior Lake (born 1990), Dominican baseball player
 Junior Lewis (born 1973), English footballer who plays in the Isthmian League Premier Division
 Júnior Lopes (born 1973), Brazilian football manager
 Junior Marvin (born 1949), Jamaican-born guitarist and singer
 Junior Mendes (born 1976), English-born Montserratian footballer
 Junior Moors (born 1986), New Zealand rugby league player
 Júnior Morales (born 1978), Honduran footballer
 Junior Morias (born 1995), Jamaican footballer
 Junior Murray (born 1968), West Indian cricketer
 Junior Murvin (c. 1946–2013), Jamaican reggae musician
 Junior Nuñez (born 1989), Peruvian footballer
 Junior Obagbemiro (born 1985), Nigerian footballer
 Junior Paulo (born 1983), New Zealand rugby league player
 Junior Paulo (born 1993), New Zealand-born Australian Rugby League player
 Junior Pelesasa (born 1980), Australian rugby union footballer
 Junior Poluleuligaga (born 1981), Samoan rugby player
 Junior Roqica (born 1991), Australian rugby league player
 Junior Ross (born 1986), Peruvian footballer
 Junior Sánchez (born 1989), Venezuelan weightlifter
 Junior Sandoval (born 1990), Honduran footballer
 Junior dos Santos (born 1984), Brazilian mixed martial artist, former UFC heavyweight champion
 Junior Sa'u (born 1987), New Zealand rugby league footballer
 Junior Sifa (born 1983), American international rugby union player
 Junior Simpson, British stand-up comedian
 Junior Sornoza (born 1994), Ecuadorian footballer
 Junior Spivey (born 1975), American baseball player
 Junior Stanislas (born 1989), English footballer
 Junior Strous (born 1986), Dutch racing driver
 Júnior Urso (born 1989), Brazilian footballer
 Junior Viza (born 1985), Peruvian footballer
 Junior Walker (1931–1995),  American musician
 Junior Witter (born 1974), English boxer

People with the nickname 
 Júnior Baiano (born 1970), Brazilian footballer (born Raimundo Ferreira Ramos Jr.)
 Junior Bridgeman (born 1953), American basketball player and businessman (born Ulysses Lee Bridgeman)
 Dale Earnhardt Jr. (born 1974), American race car driver
 Jim Gilliam (1928–1978), American Major League Baseball and Negro league player and coach
 Junior Giscombe (born 1957), British singer-songwriter
 Ken Griffey Jr. (born 1969), American Major League Baseball Hall-of-Fame player
 Antonio Morales Barreto (1943–2014), Filipino-Spanish singer and actor
 Júnior Negrão (born 1986), Brazilian footballer (born Gleidionor Figueiredo Pinto Júnior)
 Junior Seau (1969–2012), American National Football League player
 Junior Smith (born 1973), American football player
 Jack Stephens (basketball) (1933–2011), American basketball player

People with the surname 
 Cristiano Júnior (1979–2004), Brazilian footballer
 Dossa Júnior, (born 1986), Cypriot footballer
 E. J. Junior (born 1959), American football player
 Gregory Junior (born 1999), American football player
 José Júnior (born 1976), Brazilian footballer
 Leovegildo Lins da Gama Júnior (born 1954), Brazilian footballer
 Marvin Junior (1936–2013), American R&B singer, founding member of the vocal group The Dells
 Moacir Júnior (born 1967), Brazilian football manager
 Pedro Júnior (born 1987), Brazilian footballer
 Vitor Júnior (born 1986), Brazilian footballer
 Vitor Gomes Pereira Júnior (born 1989), Brazilian footballer

See also 

Lists of people by nickname
Masculine given names
Mozambican surnames
Surnames of Brazilian origin